Nasreena Ibrahim is a Maldivian public figure, former First Lady of the Maldives from 1978 until 2008, and the wife of former President Maumoon Abdul Gayyoom.

Nasreena is one of the founding members of the Society for Health Education (SHE), a charity based Non-governmental organisations in the Maldives, that works in a variety of health fields, but particularly in thalassemia and women's health. SHE is the Maldives national affiliate of the International Planned Parenthood Federation.

References

Living people
Year of birth missing (living people)
First ladies of the Maldives